Serine palmitoyltransferase, long chain base subunit 1, also known as SPTLC1, is a protein which in humans is encoded by the SPTLC1 gene.

Serine palmitoyltransferase, which consists of two different subunits, is the initial enzyme in sphingolipid biosynthesis. It converts L-serine and palmitoyl CoA to 3-oxosphinganine with pyridoxal 5'-phosphate as a cofactor. The product of this gene is the long chain base subunit 1 of serine palmitoyltransferase. Mutations in this gene were identified in patients with hereditary sensory neuropathy type 1, macular disease, and juvenile amyotrophic lateral sclerosis. Alternatively spliced variants encoding different isoforms have been identified.

References

Further reading

External links 
  GeneReviews/NIH/NCBI/UW entry on Hereditary Sensory Neuropathy Type I